HMS Naiad (F39)  was a Leander-class frigate of the Royal Navy (RN). Like the rest of the class, Naiad was named after a figure or figures of mythology, in this case the Naiads of Greek mythology. Naiad was built by Yarrow Shipbuilders of Scotstoun. She was launched on 4 November 1963 and commissioned on 15 March 1965.

Operational service
In 1966, Naiad became the leader of the Northern Ireland Squadron and subsequently deployed to the Far East and South America.  In June 1966 she was present at Kieler Woche (Kiel Week, in West Germany) and the Duke of Edinburgh held a state dinner on board in honour of West German President Heinrich Lubke.  On 4 May 1967 she recommissioned for a general service commission and was present at Portsmouth Navy Days in that year.

In 1970 Naiad deployed to the Far East, and while there, participated in the Beira Patrol, designed to prevent oil reaching the landlocked Rhodesia via the then Portuguese colony of Mozambique. She performed her second patrol the following year. The Beira Patrol was a regular deployment for the RN until 1975. In 1971 she was present at Portsmouth Navy Days.

Ikara conversion
In January 1973 Naiad began her modernisation at Devonport Dockyard, with her twin 4.5-in gun being replaced by the Australian-designed Ikara anti-submarine warfare (ASW) missile system. The modernisation was completed in 1975, and Naiad then became part of the 6th Frigate Squadron.

Third Cod War
The following year Naiad undertook a Fishery Protection Patrol during the Third Cod War, and on 24 April 1976 she was rammed by the Icelandic gunboat Tyr causing hull and bow damage. The frigate began to take tons of water, which prompted damage control teams to build a concrete enclosure around the gash. Naiad required dry docking at Devonport on her return home.

In 1977, Naiad, like many other Leanders, took part in the Fleet Review, of the Royal Navy at Spithead in celebration of the Silver Jubilee of Queen Elizabeth II. Naiad was positioned between Brighton and her sister-ship Andromeda. In 1980 Naiad deployed to the Far East once again.

In 1981 Naiad deployed to the Mediterranean. From 1983 to 1984 she underwent a refit at Devonport Dockyard. In 1985 Naiad returned to the Mediterranean as part of the NATO multi-national squadron Naval On-call Force of the Mediterranean (NAVOCFORMED), the predecessor of the Standing Naval Force Mediterranean (STANAVFORMED). The following year Naiad joined the Standing Naval Force Atlantic (STANAVFORLANT), another NATO multi-national squadron.

Decommissioning and disposal
In April 1987 Naiad was decommissioned.

In 1989 she was used for hull trials with the name Hulvul. On 24 September 1990, Naiad was towed from Portsmouth and sunk as a target.

Commanding officers

References

Publications
 
 Marriott, Leo, 1983.  Royal Navy Frigates 1945-1983, Ian Allan Ltd, Surrey.

External links
 Official HMS NAIAD website

 

Leander-class frigates
1963 ships
Ships of the Fishery Protection Squadron of the United Kingdom
Ships sunk as targets
Maritime incidents in 1990